Serhiy Olehovych Horbunov (born 14 March 1994) is a Ukrainian professional footballer who plays as a midfielder for Karpaty Lviv.

Career
Horbunov is a product of the FC Illichivets Mariupol Youth Sportive School System.

He made his debut for FC Dnipro in the match against FC Shakhtar Donetsk on 23 May 2015 in the Ukrainian Premier League.

In March 2023 he moved to Karpaty Lviv.

References

External links
 
 

1994 births
Sportspeople from Mariupol
Living people
Ukrainian footballers
Ukraine youth international footballers
Ukraine under-21 international footballers
Association football midfielders
FC Dnipro players
FC Shakhtar Donetsk players
FC Mariupol players
FC Illichivets-2 Mariupol players
FC Metalist Kharkiv players
SC Dnipro-1 players
Ukrainian Premier League players
Ukrainian First League players
Ukrainian Second League players